Thimbleby is a village and civil parish in the East Lindsey district of Lincolnshire, England.

Thimbleby is listed in Domesday Book of 1086 as "Stimbelbi", with 67 households, which at the time was considered very large. The Lord of the Manor was King William I.

The church is dedicated to Saint Margaret and is a Grade II listed building built of greenstone in 1744 to replace a medieval church on the same site,  and was largely rebuilt in 1879 by James Fowler of Louth.  It was closed in December 2010 due to unsafe stonework and electrical wiring. 

The village hall was built in 1856, originally as a school, and is Grade II listed.

The old village pump survives, dating from 1857, standing in a three sided red-brick enclosure.

There are several cottages, some mud and stud, some thatched, in Thimbleby, including White Cottage, dating from the 16th century, Rose Cottage, and The Cabin, both of which date from the 17th century, and the Old Manor dating from the 18th century.

The village has a public house, The Durham Ox.

References

External links

Villages in Lincolnshire
Civil parishes in Lincolnshire
East Lindsey District